The Pseudotettigoniinae are an extinct subfamily of the Tettigoniidae.

Genera and species 
The Orthoptera Species File lists the following:
 †Arctolocusta Zeuner, 1937: †A. groenlandica (Heer, 1883)
 †Lithymnetes Scudder, 1878: †L. guttatus Scudder, 1878
 †Nymphomorpha Henriksen, 1922: †N. medialis Henriksen, 1922
 †Pseudotettigonia Zeuner, 1937:
 †Pseudotettigonia amoena (Henriksen, 1929)
 †Pseudotettigonia leona Greenwalt & Rust, 2014

Other extinct genera in the Tettigoniidae, not assigned to a subfamily include:
 †Locustites Heer, 1849: 3 spp.
 †Locustophanes Handlirsch, 1939: †L. rhipidophorus Handlirsch, 1939
 †Prophasgonura Piton, 1940: †P. lineatocollis Piton, 1940
 †Protempusa Piton, 1940: †P. incerta Piton, 1940
 †Prototettix Giebel, 1856: †P. lithanthraca (Goldenberg, 1854)

References

External links 

Picture of a complete wing of fossil grasshopper Pseudotettigonia amoena – Natural History Museum of Denmark.

Tettigoniidae
Orthoptera subfamilies